Frances Louise Mackay (born 1 June 1990) is a New Zealand cricketer who currently plays for Canterbury and New Zealand. In January 2019, she was recalled to New Zealand's squad to play in the Women's Twenty20 International (WT20I) series against India, after a gap of five years since she last played an international match.

In March 2019, she was named as the Burger King Super Smash Women's Player of the Year at the annual New Zealand Cricket awards. In May 2021, Mackay was awarded with her first central contract from New Zealand Cricket ahead of the 2021–22 season. In February 2022, she was named in New Zealand's team for the 2022 Women's Cricket World Cup in New Zealand.

References

1990 births
Living people
New Zealand women cricketers
New Zealand women One Day International cricketers
New Zealand women Twenty20 International cricketers
Cricketers from Christchurch
Canterbury Magicians cricketers